Kiko Zambianchi (born Francisco José Zambianchi in Ribeirão Preto) is a Brazilian composer and singer.

Discography
(1985) Choque
(1986) Quadro Vivo
(1987) Kiko Zambianchi
(1989) Era das Flores
(1997) KZ
(2001) Disco Novo
(2013) Acústico ao Vivo

References
 [ Kiko Zambianchi] at AllMusic

1960 births
Living people
21st-century Brazilian male singers
21st-century Brazilian singers
Brazilian male guitarists
20th-century Brazilian male singers
20th-century Brazilian singers
People from Ribeirão Preto
Música Popular Brasileira singers
Música Popular Brasileira guitarists
Brazilian composers
Warner Music Group artists
Brazilian people of Italian descent